Sarcanthemum is a monotypic genus of flowering plants belonging to the family Asteraceae. The only species is Sarcanthemum coronopus.

Its native range is Rodrigues.

References

Asteraceae
Monotypic Asteraceae genera